The 1962–63 Romanian Hockey League season was the 33rd season of the Romanian Hockey League. Six teams participated in the league, and Vointa Miercurea Ciuc won the championship.

Regular season

External links
hochei.net

Rom
Romanian Hockey League seasons
1962–63 in Romanian ice hockey